The 2013–14 Coppin State Eagles men's basketball team represented Coppin State University during the 2013–14 NCAA Division I men's basketball season. The Eagles, led by 28th year head coach Fang Mitchell, played their home games at the Physical Education Complex and were members of the Mid-Eastern Athletic Conference. They finished the season 12–20, 7–9 in MEAC play to finish in seventh place. They advanced to the semifinals of the MEAC tournament where they lost to Morgan State.

At the end of the season, head coach Fang Mitchell's contract was not renewed. He posted a record of 429–417 in 28 seasons.

Roster

Schedule

|-
!colspan=9 style="background:#333399; color:#CFB53B;"| Regular season

|-
!colspan=9 style="background:#333399; color:#CFB53B;"| 2014 MEAC tournament

References

Coppin State Eagles men's basketball seasons
Coppin State
Coppin
Coppin